Berlin Township is a second-class township in Wayne County, Pennsylvania, United States. The township's population was 2,452 at the time of the 2020 United States Census.

Geography

Communities
The following villages are located in Berlin Township:
Beach Lake (also called Beech Pond)
Berlin Center (also called Berlin Centre)
Bethel
East Berlin
Laurella

Demographics

As of the census of 2010, there were 2,578 people and 712 families residing in the township. The racial makeup of the township was 97.5% White, 0.6% Black or African American, 0.1% American Indian or Alaska Native, 0.7% Asian. 0.2% of the township's inhabitants classified themselves as being from other races, and 0.9% identified as two or more races. Hispanics and Latinos of any race made up 2.4% of the population.

There were 1,002 households, 57.9% of which were heterosexual married couples living together (Pennsylvania did not start performing same-sex marriages until May 20, 2014), and 29.9% of which had children under the age of 18 living with them. % had a male householder with no wife present, while 8.1% had a female householder with no husband present, and 28.9% of households were non-families. 23.6% of all households were made up of individuals, 10.8% of which consisted of an individual 65 years of age or older. The average household size was 2.55 and the average family size was 3.00.

The township's population was relatively age-diverse, with 23.1% of residents under the age of 18, 60.5% aged 18 to 64, and 16.4% aged 65 years of age or older. The median age was 42.8 years.

The median income for a household in the township was $54,844, and the median income for a family was $65,375. The median income for male full-time, year-round workers was $50,902, while similar females had a median income of $28,203. The per capita income for the township was $27,739. About 7% of families and 10.4% of the population were below the poverty threshold, including 27.8% of those under age 18 and 2.2% of those ages 65 or over.

References

Townships in Wayne County, Pennsylvania
Pennsylvania populated places on the Delaware River